Bob Noble may refer to:

Bob Noble (ice hockey), coach of Orangeville Flyers
Bob Noble (politician), in Canadian federal election results in Eastern Ontario
Bob Noble (actor) in King's Quest III: To Heir Is Human (AGD Interactive)

See also
Bobby Noble (disambiguation)
Robert Noble (disambiguation)